The following is a list of notable events and releases of the year 1972 in Norwegian music.

Events

May
 24 – The 20th Bergen International Festival started in Bergen, Norway (May 24 – June 7).

June
 27 – The 2nd Kalvøyafestivalen started at Nadderudhallen near by Oslo.

August
 27 – The 3rd Kalvøyafestivalen started at Kalvøya near by Oslo.

Albums released

Unknown date

B
 Trond Botnen & Svein Finnerud Trio
 Multimal (Polydor Records), with Calle Neumann

Deaths

 January 
 10 – Sverre Jordan, composer, orchestra conductor, and pianist (born 1889).

 August 
 12 – Alf Hurum, composer and painter (born 1882).

 October
 3 – Kari Marie Aarvold Glaser, pianist and music teacher (born 1901).

Births

 March
 13 – Arve Moen Bergset, traditional folk singer, hardanger fiddler, and classical violinist.

 April
 15 – Christer Fredriksen, jazz guitarist.

 July
 4 – Ketil Gutvik, jazz guitarist.
 29 – Roger Johansen, jazz drummer and composer.

 December
 10 – Odd Nordstoga, folk singer, musician, actor, and sound editor.
 29 – Annar Follesø, violinist.

 Unknown date 
 Øyvind Nypan, guitarist and Assistant Professor (Agder University College).

See also
 1972 in Norway
 Music of Norway
 Norway in the Eurovision Song Contest 1972

References

 
Norwegian music
Norwegian
Music
1970s in Norwegian music